Michael Gardawski (born 25 September 1990) is a German professional footballer who plays as a midfielder for Greek Super League club Asteras Tripolis.

Club career
Gardawski began his 1999 career with SC Köln Weiler-Volkhovenand in the summer of 2001, before he joined 1. FC Köln's youth-team. In the summer of 2008, he was promoted to the reserve team and played six games, before he was promoted to the Fußball-Bundesliga team in 2009. On 2 February 2010, he left Köln after eight and a half years to sign a half year loan deal with FC Carl Zeiss Jena. He gave his professional debut on 6 February 2010 against FC Erzgebirge Aue.

In July 2010 he was loaned out to VfB Stuttgart II until the end of the season.

On 1 July 2011 Gardawski moved to VfL Osnabrück.

In 2013, he joined MSV Duisburg.

He was signed by Hansa Rostock in 2015.

On 8 July 2017, he signed a contract with Korona Kielce.

On 20 July 2020, he moved to Cracovia.

On 30 July 2021,he signed a contract with PAS Giannina.

International career
Gardawski was a member of the Germany U16 national team.

Personal life
He is the cousin of the former Germany national team player Lukas Sinkiewicz.

References

External links

1990 births
Living people
German footballers
German people of Polish descent
Association football fullbacks
1. FC Köln II players
1. FC Köln players
FC Carl Zeiss Jena players
VfB Stuttgart II players
VfL Osnabrück players
FC Viktoria Köln players
MSV Duisburg players
FC Hansa Rostock players
Korona Kielce players
MKS Cracovia (football) players
PAS Giannina F.C. players
Asteras Tripolis F.C. players
Regionalliga players
3. Liga players
Ekstraklasa players
Super League Greece players
German expatriate footballers
German expatriate sportspeople in Poland
Expatriate footballers in Poland
German expatriate sportspeople in Greece
Expatriate footballers in Greece
Footballers from Cologne